Ek Thi Begum, an MX Original Series, is a story of a stunningly beautiful woman played by Anuja Sathe. She plays the role of Ashraf aka Sapna, the loving wife of Zaheer played by Ankit Mohan – a once confidante of Maqsood, the underworld don, but now an arch rival. When the rift between the rivals reaches ugly culmination Zaheer gets killed. Ashraf vows to overturn and destroy Masood’s illegal empire using her beauty, sensuality and acute intelligence. Ek Thi Begum is inspired by true events created, written and directed by Sachin Darekar. It was made available for streaming on MX Player for free from 8 April 2020. On September 20, 2021, MX Player unveiled the full trailer for Ek Thi Begum 2 and on 30 September 2021, the second season was released on their platform.

Plot 

Ek thi Begum is based on a real life ‘untold’ story of a stunningly beautiful woman – Ashraf Bhatkar, born to a poor family in Aurangabad and raised in Bombay. She became the loving wife of Zaheer – a once confidante of Maqsood but now his arch-rival. Maqsood is the biggest mafia, underworld don who operates his giant drug cartel in India from Dubai.  When the rift between Maqsood and Zaheer reaches ugly culminations,  Maqsood succeeds in cunningly eliminating Zaheer. In a fake encounter, on 26 July 1986, staged by police officers, Zaheer is picked up from the airport by  cops and taken away to a secluded location and finally killed. Ashraf fights hard to secure justice but fails against the might of the mafia and political bigwigs. She vows to overturn and destroy Masood’s illegal empire. Using her beauty, sensuality and acute intelligence, she meticulously plans and executes dramatic strategies undertaking the role of a police informer. Ashraf becomes the biggest informer for the police and the biggest thorn in the flesh for Maqsood. Blinded with vengeance she becomes a powerful force of domination and influence.  She also marries a police officer Vikram Bhosle.

Ashraf acquires so much information and prepares a file that has names and proof, which threatens to expose the nexus between politicians, corrupt cops and the mafia. To avoid the ultimate expose, an attempt to kill Ashraf takes place and the file is however not found.

Ek Thi Begum is inspired by true events and all episodes went live on 8 April 2020.

Cast and Characters

Marketing and Release

Promotion 
The official trailer of the web series was launched on 6 April 2020, by MX Player on YouTube. On 20 September 2021, the official trailer of the second season was released on the official Youtube account of MX Player

Release 
Ek Thi Begum was made available for free streaming on MX Player from 8 April 2020. On 30 September 2021, MX Player released the second season on their platform.

Critical response 
The Scroll.in in a review of Ek Thi Begum, wrote, "Ek Thi Begum is hard-pressed to answer these questions despite 14 episodes at its disposal and the promise of a second season. Despite ample opportunities, Ek Thi Begum turns out to be a damp squib that ultimately adds little to the gangster canon in popular culture."

References

External links
 

2020 Indian television series debuts
MX Player original programming
Hindi-language web series
Indian web series
Thriller web series
Indian crime television series
Indian thriller television series
Television series set in the 1980s
Television series set in 1986
Indian historical television series
Works about organised crime in India
Television shows set in Mumbai
Television shows set in Gujarat